Edwin Vidal Palmer (23 May 1869 – 28 April 1917) was a New Zealand cricketer, sheep farmer, and local politician.

Life and career
Edwin Palmer was born in Christchurch and educated at Christ's College, Christchurch, and Jesus College, Cambridge, where he completed a BA degree.

A left-arm pace bowler, he played cricket for Canterbury in the 1892–93 and 1893–94 seasons. On his first-class debut he took 3 for 22 and 5 for 32 to help Canterbury to a two-wicket victory over Otago. The next season, when a selected player had to withdraw, he played in New Zealand's first representative first-class match, against New South Wales in Christchurch.

On 3 June 1902 he married Edith Tabart at St Mark's Church, Opawa, Christchurch. They bought a sheep farm at Whatatutu, north of Gisborne, and moved there. He served as a member of Waikohu County Council for several years.

He had been in poor health for some time before his death, and travelled to Dunedin for an operation, but it was unsuccessful, and he died at the age of 47. He and Edith had a daughter, Peggy.

References

External links

1869 births
1917 deaths
New Zealand cricketers
Pre-1930 New Zealand representative cricketers
Canterbury cricketers
Cricketers from Christchurch
People educated at Christ's College, Christchurch
Alumni of Jesus College, Cambridge
Local politicians in New Zealand